Eeki Kuparinen is a Grand Prix motorcycle racer from Finland. He races in the RFME Superstock 1000 Championship aboard a Kawasaki ZX-10R. In 2012 Kuparinen competed in the FIM Superstock 1000 Championship aboard a BMW, in two wildcard rides failed to finish in both, Kuparinen continued to make sporadic appearances in the 2013 FIM Superstock 1000 Championship with one point scoring finish of 13th in the second race at Silverstone.

Career statistics

By season

Races by year

References

External links
 Profile on motogp.com
 Profile on SBK.com

Finnish motorcycle racers
Living people
1991 births
125cc World Championship riders
FIM Superstock 1000 Cup riders
Sportspeople from Turku